This is a list of United States Air Force Strategic Reconnaissance Wings assigned to Strategic Air Command (SAC) from 1946 to 1992 when SAC was disestablished. At the bottom of the list is a gallery of images of example mission equipment used by these Wings.

Note: Due to the United States Air Force common practice of redesignating units, bases and equipment, links that you will find in this list may take you to an article with different headings than you might expect. If you continue to read through that article, you will find the subject linked from.

Mission Equipment 
The following gallery shows one example of each type of aircraft used by these reconnaissance wings as Mission Equipment.

Reconnaissance wings of the United States Air Force